Buckrose was a county constituency of the House of Commons of the Parliament of the United Kingdom, comprising the northern part of the East Riding of Yorkshire, represented by one Member of Parliament, and was created for the 1885 general election.

Buckrose was abolished for the 1950 general election, when boundary changes reduced the East Riding's number of county constituencies from three to two, the eastern part of the constituency and most of the voters being included in the new Bridlington constituency and the remainder in the Beverley constituency.

Boundaries
1885–1918: The Sessional Divisions of Bainton Beacon, Buckrose, and Dickering.

1918–1950: The Borough of Bridlington, the Urban Districts of Filey, Great Driffield, and Norton, and the Rural Districts of Bridlington, Driffield, Norton, and Sherburn.

The constituency consisted of the northern third of the East Riding of Yorkshire. The largest town in the seat was Bridlington, but it also included Filey, Driffield, and Norton, as well as numerous villages, and the rural element was predominant. At the time of the 1921 census, almost two-fifths (38%) of the occupied male population were engaged in agriculture.

Name
Buckrose took its name from the wapentake of Buckrose, one of the medieval sub-divisions of the East Riding which, however, had long ceased to have much administrative significance by 1885, and had covered only part of the area of the constituency and a minority of its population. (The constituency also included the whole of the former wapentake of Dickering, which included Bridlington and Filey, and part of the wapentake of Harthill which included Driffield.) The name seems to have been chosen primarily to avoid offending any local sensibilities, and with little regard for comprehensibility (a criticism also levelled at many of the other new constituency names created under the 1885 Reform Act).

Members of Parliament

Elections

Elections in the 1880s 

At the General Election of 1886, McArthur was declared the victor over Sykes by a single vote, 3,742 to 3,741, and took his seat, but "on scrutiny" the seat was eventually awarded to his opponent, Sykes, by a majority of 11 votes.

Elections in the 1890s

Elections in the 1900s

Elections in the 1910s 

General Election 1914–15:
Another General Election was required to take place before the end of 1915. The political parties had been making preparations for an election to take place from 1914 and by the end of this year, the following candidates had been selected; 
Liberal: Luke White

Elections in the 1920s

Elections in the 1930s

Elections in the 1940s
General Election 1939–40:

Another General Election was required to take place before the end of 1940. The political parties had been making preparations for an election to take place from 1939 and by the end of this year, the following candidates had been selected; 
Conservative: Albert Braithwaite 
Liberal: Thomas Macleod

Notes

References
 F W S Craig, "British Parliamentary Election Results 1918-49" (Glasgow: Parliamentary Research Services, 1969)
 Michael Kinnear, "The British Voter" (London: Batsford, 1968)
 Frederic A Youngs, jr, "Guide to the Local Administrative Units of England, Vol II" (London: Royal Historical Society, 1991)
 "The Constitutional Yearbook, 1913" (London: National Unionist Association, 1913) 
 

Parliamentary constituencies of the East Riding of Yorkshire (defunct)
Constituencies of the Parliament of the United Kingdom established in 1885
Constituencies of the Parliament of the United Kingdom disestablished in 1950